Barrô was a freguesia ("civil parish") in Águeda Municipality, Aveiro District, Portugal. It had an area of 7 km2 and in 2011 had a population of 1836.

History 
In 2013 it was merged with Aguada de Baixo to form the new freguesia of Barrô e Aguada de Baixo.

Places 
 Barrô
 Carqueijo

Demography

Politics

Elections 
As of 31 December 2011, it had 1722 registered voters. In the 2009 local elections for the Assembly of the Freguesia, there were 1711 registered voters, with 1013 (59.21%) voting and 698 (40.79%) abstaining. The Social Democratic Party got 527 (57,28%) of the votes, electing six members of the Assembly and the Socialist Party got 368 votes (36.33%), electing three members of the Assembly.

Religion 
The Portuguese Roman Catholic Church's Diocese of Aveiro includes the Parish of Barrô as part of the archpriestship of Águeda. There is a church and a chapel in this former freguesia, both from the 17th century.

References 

Former parishes of Águeda
2013 disestablishments in Portugal
Populated places disestablished in 2013